Scargo Tower is a  cobblestone tower located atop Scargo Hill in Dennis, Massachusetts on Cape Cod.

History
There have been three Scargo towers at this spot. The first tower was built in 1874 by the Tobey family. Constructed out of wood, it was destroyed by a gale in 1876. The second tower, known as "Tobey Tower" and also made of wood, burned down in 1900. The present tower, was built of cobblestone in 1901 as a memorial to the Tobey family. The tower stands thirty feet high. It is located on the highest hill in the area. From the tower, one can see almost all of Cape Cod on the bay side, including Provincetown and the Sagamore Bridge.

The Scargo Tower plaque

A plaque placed above the entrance to the tower reads, "This tower and hilltop were given to the town of Dennis in 1929 as a memorial to Charles Tobey (1831–1888) and Francis Bassett Tobey (1833–1913). Loyal sons of the village of Dennis where their Tobey ancestors settled in 1678."

Geography

Scargo tower sits atop Scargo Hill, one of the tallest [] and best-known hills on Cape Cod.  The tower is located in the town of Dennis, Massachusetts off of Scargo Hill road, to the south of Scargo Lake.

References

External links

 Scargo Tower, Dennis Historical Society
 http://www.vacationsmadeeasy.com/CapeCodMA/pointsOfInterest/ScargoTowerinEastDennisMA.cfm
 http://newenglandtravels.blogspot.com/2008/08/scargo-tower-dennis-mass.html

Buildings and structures in Barnstable County, Massachusetts
Dennis, Massachusetts
Tourist attractions in Barnstable County, Massachusetts
Towers in Massachusetts

1874 establishments in Massachusetts
1876 establishments in Massachusetts
Towers completed in 1874
Buildings and structures demolished in 1876

1900 disestablishments in Massachusetts
Buildings and structures demolished in 1900

1901 establishments in Massachusetts
Towers completed in 1901